Gregory Powell may refer to:

Greg Powell, American stuntman
Gregory Powell (murderer), accomplice in The Onion Field murder
D. Gregory Powell, Canadian physician
Powell and Donovan, fictional characters from Isaac Asimov's Robot short stories